Phillip Henry Carlyon (January 6, 1863 – November 26, 1946) was an American politician in the state of Washington. He served in the Washington House of Representatives. He served as Speaker from 1933 to 1935 and from 1945 to 1947.

References

1863 births
1946 deaths
Republican Party members of the Washington House of Representatives
Republican Party Washington (state) state senators